Samuel Dale Brownback (born September 12, 1956) is an American attorney, politician, diplomat, and member of the Republican Party was the United States Ambassador at Large for International Religious Freedom from 2018 to 2021. Brownback previously served as the Secretary of Agriculture of Kansas (1986–1993), as the U.S. representative for Kansas's 2nd congressional district (1995–1996), as a United States senator from Kansas (1996–2011) and the 46th governor of Kansas (2011–2018). He also ran for the Republican nomination for President in 2008.

Born in Garnett, Kansas, Brownback grew up on the family farm in Parker, Kansas. He graduated from Kansas State University with a degree in agricultural economics in 1978 and received a J.D. from the University of Kansas in 1982. He worked as an attorney in Manhattan, Kansas, before being appointed Secretary of Agriculture of Kansas in 1986 by Democratic Governor John W. Carlin. Brownback ran for Congress in 1994 and defeated Carlin in the general election in a landslide. He represented Kansas's 2nd congressional district for a single term before running in a 1996 special election for the U.S. Senate seat previously held by Bob Dole. He won the election and was reelected by large margins in 1998 and 2004. Brownback ran for president in 2008, but withdrew before the primaries began and endorsed eventual Republican nominee John McCain.

Brownback declined to run for reelection in 2010, instead running for governor. He was elected governor of Kansas in 2010 and took office in January 2011. As governor, Brownback initiated what he called a "red-state experiment"—dramatic cuts in income tax rates intended to bring economic growth. He signed into law one of the largest income tax cuts in Kansas history, known as the Kansas experiment. The tax cuts caused state revenues to fall by hundreds of millions of dollars and created large budget shortfalls. A major budget deficit led to cuts in areas including education and transportation. In a repudiation of the Patient Protection and Affordable Care Act, in 2013 Brownback turned down a $31.5 million grant from the U.S. Department of Health and Human Services to set up a public health insurance exchange for Kansas. Also in 2013, he signed a bill that blocked tax breaks for abortion providers, banned sex-selection abortions, and declared that life begins at fertilization. In the run-up to the 2014 gubernatorial election, over 100 former and current Kansas Republican officials criticized Brownback's leadership and endorsed his Democratic opponent, Paul Davis. Despite this, Brownback was narrowly reelected. In June 2017, the Kansas Legislature repealed Brownback's tax cuts, overrode Brownback's veto of the repeal, and enacted tax increases. Brownback, who had a 66% disapproval rating after the repeal of his signature law, left office as one of the least popular governors in the country.

On July 26, 2017, the Trump administration issued a statement that Brownback would be nominated as the new U.S. Ambassador-at-Large for International Religious Freedom. The nomination was forwarded by committee, on a party line vote, but expired at the end of 2017 in lieu of a Senate confirmation vote by the time of adjournment. The committee re-sent his nomination to the Senate on January 8, 2018, and he was confirmed two weeks later in a strict party-line vote with Vice President Mike Pence casting the necessary tie-breaking vote to end a filibuster and for his confirmation. On January 25, Brownback submitted his resignation as governor, effective January 31, and Lieutenant Governor Jeff Colyer was sworn in as governor. Brownback was sworn in as U.S. Ambassador at Large for International Religious Freedom on February 1.

Early life and education
Sam Brownback was born on September 12, 1956, in Garnett, Kansas, to Nancy (Cowden) and Glen Robert Brownback. He was raised in a farming family in Parker, Kansas. Some of Brownback's German-American ancestors settled in Kansas after leaving Pennsylvania following the Civil War. Throughout his youth, Brownback was involved with the FFA (formerly the Future Farmers of America), serving as president of his local and state FFA chapters, and as national FFA vice president from 1976 to 1977.

After graduating from Prairie View High School, Brownback attended Kansas State University, where was elected student body president and became a member of the Alpha Gamma Rho agricultural fraternity. After graduating from college in 1978 with a degree in Agricultural Economics in 1978, he spent about a year working as a radio broadcaster for the now-defunct KSAC farm department, hosting a weekly half-hour show. Brownback received his J.D. from the University of Kansas in 1982.

Early career
Brownback was an attorney in Manhattan, Kansas, before being appointed as Kansas Secretary of Agriculture by Governor John W. Carlin on September 18, 1986. In 1990, he was accepted into the White House Fellow program and detailed to the Office of the U.S. Trade Representative from 1990 to 1991. Brownback returned to Kansas to resume his position as Secretary of Agriculture. He left his post on July 30, 1993. He was elected to the U.S. House of Representatives in 1994 and ran in the 1996 special election for the U.S. Senate seat recently vacated by Bob Dole, beating appointed Republican Sheila Frahm.

U.S. Senator (1996–2011)

Elections
Sheila Frahm was appointed to fill the seat of U.S. Senator Bob Dole when Dole resigned in 1996 to campaign for president. Brownback defeated Frahm in the 1996 Republican primary and went on to win the general election against Democrat Jill Docking. Later in 2001, the Federal Election Commission assessed fines and penalties against Brownback's campaign committee and against his in-laws for improper 1996 campaign contributions. As a result of these improper contributions, the campaign was ordered to give the government $19,000 in contributions and Brownback's in-laws, John and Ruth Stauffer, were ordered to pay a $9,000 civil penalty for improperly funneling contributions through Triad Management Services.

In 1998 Brownback was elected to a full six-year term, defeating Democrat Paul Feleciano. He won reelection in the 2004 Senate election with 69% of the vote, defeating his Democratic challenger, Lee Jones, a former Washington, D.C. lobbyist.

Throughout his Senate career, his principal campaign donors were the Koch brothers and their enterprises, including Koch Industries.

Tenure

Brownback was a member of the Judiciary Committee, the Senate Appropriations Committee (where he chaired the Subcommittee on District of Columbia when the Republicans were in the majority), the Joint Economic Committee, and the Commission on Security and Cooperation in Europe, also known as the Helsinki Commission, which he at one time chaired. The Helsinki Commission monitors compliance with international agreements reached in cooperation with Organization for Security and Co-operation in Europe.

In 2000, Brownback and Congressman Chris Smith led the effort to enact the Trafficking Victims Protection Act. President Clinton signed the legislation in October 2000. According to Christianity Today, the stronger enforcement increased the number of U.S. federal trafficking cases eightfold in the five years after enactment.

By August 12, 2007, in the 110th Session of Congress, Brownback had missed 123 votes due to campaigning (39.7 percent)–surpassed only by Tim Johnson (D) of South Dakota who due to a critical illness had missed 100% of the votes of the 110th Session, and John McCain (R) of Arizona with 149 votes missed due to campaigning (48.1 percent).

By April 2012, Brownback had an approval rating of 34 percent according to a Survey USA Poll. A Republican polling company found his approval rating to be 51 percent in May 2012. In November 2015, Brownback had an approval rating of 26 percent according to a Morning Consult poll, the lowest among all governors in the United States.

In 2006, Brownback blocked a confirmation vote on a George W. Bush federal appeals court nominee from Michigan, judge Janet T. Neff. He objected to her joining the bench solely for her having attended a same-sex commitment ceremony in Massachusetts in 2002 which involved a next door neighbor who was a close childhood friend of Neff's daughters. His action had blocked confirmation votes on an entire slate of appointments that already had been approved by a bipartisan group of Senators. In July 2007, he finally lifted his block that had prevented the vote, and the Senate confirmed her by 83–4. Brownback was joined in opposition by just three other conservatives, then-Senators Jim Bunning, Jon Kyl, and Mel Martinez.

CREW complaints
In 2009, Citizens for Responsibility and Ethics in Washington (CREW) filed an ethics complaint in 2009 over a fundraising letter signed by Brownback for a conservative Catholic group which they alleged violated Senate rules by mimicking official Senate letterhead. The letter had targeted five senators for being both Catholic and pro-choice: Maria Cantwell, John Kerry, Robert Menendez, Barbara Mikulski, and Patty Murray. A spokesman said Brownback had asked the group to stop sending the letter even before the complaint was filed.

CREW urged an ethics investigation in 2010, based on a complaint which was lodged by a Protestant group.twas claiminted there was a sible violation of the Senate's gifts rule by four Republican Senators and a Republican and three Democratic House members lodging in a $1.8 million townhouse owned by C Street Center, Inc., which was in turn owned by Christian-advocacy group The Fellowship. The rent was $950 per month per person. CREW alleged that the property was being leased exclusively to congressional members, including Brownback, at under fair market value, based on the cost of hotel rooms nearby. Senator Tom Coburn's spokesman told The Hill there were Craigslist ads that demonstrated that $950 was fair market value for a room on Capitol Hill and that "Residents at the [C Street] boarding house have one bedroom. Most share a bathroom. All pay for their own meals and share communal space with the other residents and guests."

Committees
 Committee on Appropriations
 Subcommittee on Agriculture, Rural Development, Food and Drug Administration, and Related Agencies (Ranking Member)
 Subcommittee on Defense
 Subcommittee on Homeland Security
 Subcommittee on Military Construction, Veterans Affairs, and Related Agencies
 Subcommittee on the Department of State, Foreign Operations, and Related Programs
 Subcommittee on Transportation, Housing and Urban Development, and Related Agencies
 Committee on Commerce, Science, and Transportation
 Subcommittee on Aviation Operations, Safety, and Security
 Subcommittee on Communications, Technology, and the Internet
 Subcommittee on Competitiveness, Innovation, and Export Promotion
 Subcommittee on Surface Transportation and Merchant Marine Infrastructure, Safety, and Security
 Committee on Energy and Natural Resources
 Subcommittee on Energy
 Subcommittee on National Parks
 Subcommittee on Water and Power (Ranking Member)
Committee on Foreign Relations
 Special Committee on Aging
 Joint Economic Committee
 Commission on Security and Cooperation in Europe

Other notes

Brownback, while U.S. Senator in the mid-1990s, hired Paul Ryan as his chief legislative director. Ryan later became a member of Congress, vice-presidential candidate, and then Speaker of the U.S. House of Representatives.

Throughout his U.S. Senate career, his principal campaign donors were the Koch brothers of Wichita-based Koch Industries, who donated more to Brownback than to any other political candidate during this period.

2008 presidential campaign

On December 4, 2006, Brownback formed an exploratory committee, the first step toward candidacy, and announced his presidential bid the next day. His views placed him in the social conservative wing of the Republican Party, and he stressed his fiscal conservatism. "I am an economic, a fiscal, a social and a compassionate conservative", he said in December 2006.
On January 20, 2007, in Topeka, he announced that he was running for President in 2008. On February 22, 2007, a poll conducted by Rasmussen Reports held that three percent of likely primary voters would support Brownback.

On August 11, 2007, Brownback finished third in the Ames Straw Poll with 15.3 percent of all votes cast. Fundraising and visits to his website declined dramatically after this event, as many supporters had predicted Brownback would do much better, and speculation began that the candidate was considering withdrawing from the campaign. This sentiment increased after his lackluster performance in the GOP presidential debate of September 5, broadcast from New Hampshire by Fox News Channel. He dropped out of the race on October 18, 2007, citing a lack of funds. He formally announced his decision on October 19. He later endorsed John McCain for president.

2010 gubernatorial campaign

In 2008, Brownback acknowledged he was considering running for governor in 2010. In January 2009, Brownback officially filed the paperwork to run for governor.

His principal Senate-career campaign donors, the Koch brothers (and their Koch Industries), again backed Brownback's campaign.

Polling agency Rasmussen Reports found that Brownback led his then-likely Democratic opponent, Tom Holland, by 31 points in May 2010.

On June 1, 2010, Brownback named Kansas state Senator Jeff Colyer as his running mate.

On November 2, 2010, Brownback won over Holland with 63.3% of the vote, replacing Governor Mark Parkinson, who was sworn in after former Governor Kathleen Sebelius resigned from her position and accepted the appointment to US Secretary of Health and Human Services in 2009.

Governor of Kansas (2011–2018)

Brownback took office in January 2011, in the early years of national recovery from the Great Recession. Along with his victory, the Legislative Republicans resumed control of the Kansas House of Representatives with their largest majority in half a century (now largely members of the Tea Party movement sharing Brownback's views).

Two of Brownback's major stated goals were to reduce taxes and to increase spending on education.

Three separate polls between November 2015 and September 2016 ranked Brownback as the nation's least-popular governor—a September 2016 poll showing an approval rating of 23%. In the state elections of 2016—seen largely as a referendum on Brownback's policies and administration—Brownback's supporters in the legislature suffered major defeats. In 2017 after a protracted battle, the new Kansas Legislature overrode Brownback's vetoes, voting to repeal his tax cuts and enact tax increases.

In 2018 The Kansas City Star was named the only finalist in the Public Service category of the 2018 Pulitzer Prize for a series "Why, so secret, Kansas?" which said that Kansas which had always been excessively secret in government reporting had only grown worse under Brownback. Brownback's successor Jeff Colyer through executive order reversed some of the secrecy.

Legislative agenda
Brownback has proposed fundamental tax reform to encourage investment and generate wealth while creating new jobs. Consistent with those objectives, he also proposed structural reforms to the state's largest budget items, school finance, Medicaid, and Kansas Public Employees Retirement System (KPERS), which have unfunded liabilities of $8.3 billion. Brownback sought to follow a "red state model", passing conservative social and economic policies.

Taxes

In May 2012, Brownback signed into law one of the largest income tax cuts in Kansas' history—the nation's largest state income tax cut (in percentage) since the 1990s. Brownback described the tax cuts as a live experiment: 

The legislation was crafted with help from his Budget Director (former Koch brothers political consultant Steven Anderson); the Koch-sponsored American Legislative Exchange Council (ALEC); and Arthur Laffer, a popular supply-side economist and former economic adviser for President Ronald Reagan.

The law eliminated non-wage income taxes for the owners of 191,000 businesses, and cut individuals' income tax rates. The first phase of his cuts reduced the top Kansas income-tax rate from 6.45 percent down to 4.9 percent, and immediately eliminated income tax on business profits from partnerships and limited liability corporations passed through to individuals. The income tax cuts would provide 231 million in tax reductions in its first year, growing to 934 million after six years. A forecast from the Legislature's research staff indicated that a budget shortfall will emerge by 2014 and will grow to nearly 2.5 billion by July 2018. The cuts were based on model legislation published by the American Legislative Exchange Council (ALEC).

In an op-ed dated May 2014 in The Wall Street Journal, titled "A Midwest Renaissance Rooted in the Reagan Formula", Brownback compared his tax cut policies with those of Ronald Reagan, and announced a "prosperous future" for Kansas, Oklahoma and Missouri, by having enacted the economic principles that Reagan laid out in 1964.

The act has received criticism for shifting the tax burden from wealthy Kansans to low- and moderate-income workers, with the top income tax rate dropping by 25%. Under Brownback, Kansas also lowered the sales tax and eliminated a tax on small businesses. The tax cuts helped contribute to Moody's downgrading of the state's bond rating in 2014. They also contributed to the S&P Ratings' credit downgrade from AA+ to AA in August 2014 due to a budget that analysts described as structurally unbalanced. As of June 2014, the state had fallen far short of projected tax collections, receiving $369 million instead of the planned-for $651 million.

The tax cuts and the effect on the economy of Kansas received considerable criticism in the media, including Michael Hiltzik in the Los Angeles Times, the editorial board of The Washington Post, The New Republic, Bloomberg Businessweek, and The New York Times who described Brownback's "conservative experiment" as a laboratory for policies that are "too far to the right" and that as a result more than 100 current and former Republican elected officials endorsed his opponent in the 2014 gubernatorial race, Democrat Paul Davis. Grover Norquist defended the tax cuts as a model for the nation.

In February 2017, a bi-partisan coalition presented a bill that would repeal most of Brownback's tax overhaul to make up for the budget shortfall. The Senate passed SB 30 (38–0, with 2 not voting) on February 2, 2017. The House passed SB 30 as amended (123–2) on February 22, 2017. The Conference Committee Report was adopted by both the House (69–52) and Senate (26–14) on June 5, 2017. On June 6, 2017, the bill was sent to Governor Brownback for signature, but he vetoed the bill. Later in the day both the House and Senate voted to override the veto. Senate Bill 30 repealed most of the tax cuts which had taken effect in January 2013.

Brownback's tax overhaul was described in a June 2017 article in The Atlantic as the United States' "most aggressive experiment in conservative economic policy". The drastic tax cuts had "threatened the viability of schools and infrastructure" in Kansas.

Education
In April 2014, Brownback signed a controversial school finance bill that eliminated mandatory due process hearings, which were previously required to fire experienced teachers. According to the Kansas City Star:  The resulting cuts in funding caused districts to shut down the school year early.

Economy
In 2015, the job growth rate in Kansas was 0.8 percent, among the lowest rate in America with only "10,900 total nonfarm jobs" added that year. Kansas had a $350 million budget shortfall in February 2017. In February 2017, S&P downgraded Kansas' credit rating to AA−.

Health care
In August 2011, over the objections of Republican Kansas Insurance Commissioner Sandy Praeger, Brownback announced he was declining a $31.5 million grant from the U.S. Department of Health and Human Services to set up an insurance exchange as part of the federal health care reform law. In May 2011, Brownback had directed the state's insurance commissioner to slow the implementation timeline for the exchange development. Upon announcing the refusal of the budgeted grant money for the state, his office stated:  The move was unanimously supported by the delegates of the state party central committee at its August 2011 meeting, but a New York Times editorial criticized Brownback for turning down the grant which could have helped ease the state's own budget: 

Brownback also signed into law the Health Care Freedom Act, based on model legislation published by the American Legislative Exchange Council (ALEC).

Abortion

Brownback signed three anti-abortion bills in 2011. In April 2011, he signed a bill banning abortion after 21 weeks, and a bill requiring that a doctor get a parent's notarized signature before providing an abortion to a minor. In May 2011, Brownback approved a bill prohibiting insurance companies from offering abortion coverage as part of general health plans unless the procedure is necessary to save a woman's life. The law also prohibits any health-insurance exchange in Kansas established under the federal Affordable Care Act from offering coverage for abortions other than to save a woman's life.

A Kansas budget passed with Brownback's approval in 2011 blocked Planned Parenthood of Kansas and Mid-Missouri from receiving family planning funds from the state. The funding amounted to about $330,000 a year. A judge has blocked the budget provision, ordered Kansas to begin funding the organization again, and agreed with Planned Parenthood that it was being unfairly targeted. In response, the state filed an appeal seeking to overturn the judge's decision. Brownback has defended anti-abortion laws in Kansas, including the Planned Parenthood defunding. "You can't know for sure what all comes out of that afterwards, but it was the will of the Legislature and the people of the state of Kansas", Brownback said.

In May 2012, Brownback signed the Health Care Rights of Conscience Act, which "will allow pharmacists to refuse to provide drugs they believe might cause an abortion".

In April 2013, Brownback signed a bill that blocked tax breaks for abortion providers, banned sex-selection abortions and declared that life begins at fertilization. The law notes that any rights suggested by the language are limited by U.S. Supreme Court decisions.

On April 7, 2015, Brownback signed The Unborn Child Protection From Dismemberment Abortion Act, which bans the most common technique used for second-trimester abortions. This made Kansas the first state to do so.

Prayer rally
Brownback was the only other governor to attend Governor Rick Perry's prayer event in August 2011. About 22,000 people attended the rally, and Brownback and Perry were the only elected officials to speak. The decision resulted in some controversy and newspaper editorials demonstrating disappointment in his attendance of the rally.

2014 gubernatorial election

In October 2013, Kansas state representative Paul Davis, the Democratic minority leader of the Kansas House of Representatives, announced he would challenge Brownback in the 2014 Kansas gubernatorial election.

In July 2014, more than 100 current and former Kansas Republican officials (including former state party chairmen, Kansas Senate presidents, Kansas House speakers, and majority leaders) endorsed Democrat Davis over Republican Brownback—citing concern over Brownback's deep cuts in education and other government services, as well as the tax cuts that had left the state with a major deficit.

Tim Keck, chief of staff of Brownback's running mate, Lt. Governor Jeff Colyer, unearthed and publicized a 1998 police report that noted that Davis, 26 and unmarried at the time, had been briefly detained during the raid of a strip club, where he had been taken by his new boss at a law firm that represented the club. Davis was found to have no involvement in the cause for the raid and quickly allowed to leave. The incident and its publication were seen as particularly advantageous for Brownback (who, until then, had trailed badly in polling), as it could be expected to become the focus of a typical 30-second campaign ad used to characterize his opponent.

Responding to criticism of Keck's involvement in the campaign, Brownback spokesman Paul Milburn commented that it was legal to use taxpayer-paid staff to campaign, responding directly to the controversy, saying that "Paul Davis must have spent too much time in VIP rooms at strip clubs back in law school" because he "should know full well that the law allows personal staff of the governor's office to work on campaign issues." In Kansas, however, getting records about crimes that law enforcement has investigated is typically difficult. The Legislature closed those records to the public over three decades earlier: If members of the public desire incident reports and investigative files, they normally have to sue to obtain them, cases sometimes costing $25,000 or more. Media law experts were amazed after learning Montgomery County's sheriff released non-public investigative files from 1998 with just a records request. "That is unusual," said Mike Merriam, media lawyer for the Kansas Press Association. "They have denied releasing records routinely over and over and over again." Brownback's campaign capitalized on the 16-year-old incident.

Brownback was reelected with a plurality, defeating Davis by a 3.69 percent margin. His appointment of Tim Keck as Secretary of the Department of Aging and Disability was confirmed on January 18, 2017.

U.S. Ambassador-at-Large for International Religious Freedom

Nomination
In March 2017, it was reported that Brownback was being considered by President Donald Trump to be appointed either as his U.S. Ambassador to the U.N. for Food and Agriculture in Rome, or as the U.S. Ambassador-at-Large for International Religious Freedom in Washington, DC. On July 26, 2017, the White House issued a statement that Brownback would be nominated as the new U.S. Ambassador-at-Large for International Religious Freedom. As a senator in 1998, Brownback sponsored the legislation that first created the United States Commission on International Religious Freedom (USCIRF).

Due to his positions and actions on Islam and LGBT issues, Brownback's nomination was criticized by figures such as Rabbi Moti Rieber, the executive director of Kansas Interfaith Action, Robert McCaw, director of government affairs for the Council on American-Islamic Relations (CAIR), as well as the American Civil Liberties Union.

As of the end of the 2017 session, Brownback's Ambassadorial nomination had not come up for a confirmation vote. As it failed to receive unanimous support for it to carry over to 2018 for approval, it required renomination to come to a vote. He was renominated on January 8, 2018.

On January 24, 2018, the Senate voted along party lines, 49–49, with two Republicans absent, to advance his nomination to the floor, with Vice President Mike Pence casting the tie-breaking vote to end the Democrats' filibuster. With the Senate again locked at 49–49 later that day, Pence again cast the tie-breaking vote, confirming the nomination. On January 25, Brownback submitted his resignation as governor, effective January 31, 2018, on which date Lieutenant Governor Jeff Colyer was sworn in as governor.

Tenure
Brownback was sworn in on February 1, 2018. He became the first Catholic to serve in the role.

In July 2018, Brownback reportedly lobbied the UK government over the treatment of far-right British activist Tommy Robinson. Arizona Republican Representative Paul Gosar and five other congressmen invited Robinson to speak to United States Congress on November 14, 2018, on a trip sponsored by the U.S.-based, Middle East Forum. He was expected to get visa approval by the State Department despite his criminal convictions and use of fraudulent passports to enter and depart the U.S.

Issues 
Brownback was Ambassador at Large for International Religious Freedom and has been vocal about global issues of religious persecution and actively promoting religious freedom as a means of promoting individual and economic flourishing and reducing terrorism and other types of religion-related violence.

Brownback repeatedly has condemned China's assault on religious freedom, saying, "China is at war with faith. It is a war they will not win." He highlighted the persecution of China's Uighur Muslims, Tibetan Buddhists, Falun Gong practitioners, and Chinese Christians. In remarks made at the United Nations, Brownback strongly condemned the Xinjiang re-education camps where more than 1 million Uighur Muslims are reported to have been detained in what the Chinese government has called "vocational training camps."

In his first trip as Ambassador, Brownback traveled to Bangladesh to meet with Rohingya refugees from Myanmar at the Kutupalong refugee camp near Cox's Bazar, Bangladesh. Brownback characterized the accounts of violence he heard as bad or worse than anything he had ever seen, including visits to Darfur, Sudan in 2004. Following the trip the State Department highlighted Myanmar's intensification of violence against its ethnic minorities. In the 2017 International Religious Freedom Report, the State Department described the violence against the Rohingya that forced an estimated 688,000 people to flee Myanmar as "ethnic cleansing."

At the 2020 Ministerial to Advance Freedom of Religion or Belief in Poland, Brownback spoke about COVID-19's effect on freedom of religion.

Positions

Abortion
Brownback opposes abortion in all cases except when the life of the pregnant woman is in danger. He has a 100% pro-life rating from the National Right to Life Committee and a 0% rating from NARAL Pro-Choice America. Brownback also supports parental notification for minors who seek an abortion and opposes partial birth abortion. He was personally anti-abortion though politically pro-choice during his early career. Brownback has more recently said, "I see it as the lead moral issue of our day, just like slavery was the lead moral issue 150 years ago." On May 3, 2007, when asked his opinion of repealing Roe v. Wade, Brownback said, "It would be a glorious day of human liberty and freedom."

In 2007, Brownback said he "could support a pro-choice nominee" to the presidency because "this is a big coalition party."

Arts
In May 2011, Brownback eliminated by executive order and then vetoed government funding for the Kansas Arts Commission in response to state defiance of his executive order, making Kansas the first state to de-fund its arts commission. The National Endowment for the Arts informed Kansas that without a viable state arts agency, it would not receive a planned $700,000 federal grant. Brownback has said he believes private donations should fund arts and culture in the state. He created the Kansas Arts Foundation, an organization dedicated to private fundraising to make up the gap created by state budget cuts.

Capital punishment
Brownback said in an interview: "I am not a supporter of a death penalty, other than in cases where we cannot protect the society and have other lives at stake." In a speech on the Senate Judiciary Committee, he questioned the current use of the death penalty as potentially incongruent with the notion of a "culture of life", and suggested it be employed in a more limited fashion.

Darfur
Brownback visited refugee camps in Sudan in 2004 and returned to write a resolution labeling the Darfur conflict as genocide, and has been active on attempting to increase U.S. efforts to resolve the situation short of military intervention. He is an endorser of the Genocide Intervention Network, which called him a "champion of Darfur" in its Darfur scorecard, primarily for his early advocacy of the Darfur Peace and Accountability Act.

Economic issues

He was rated 100 percent by the US Chamber of Commerce, indicating a pro-business voting record.

He has consistently supported a low tax-and-spend policy for government. As governor he urged a flattening of the income tax to spur economic growth in Kansas. In December 2005, Brownback advocated using Washington, DC, as a laboratory for a flat tax. He voted Yes on a Balanced-budget constitutional amendment. He opposed the Estate Tax.

He was rated 100 percent by the Cato Institute, indicating a pro-free trade voting record.

Environmental protection
In 2005, the organization Republicans for Environmental Protection (REP) gave Brownback a grade of 7 percent for the 107th United States Congress, but in 2006, increased the rating to 26%. Senator Brownback supported an amendment to the Energy Policy Act of 2005, offered by Senator Jeff Bingaman, (D-NM), requiring at least 10 percent of electricity sold by utilities to originate from renewable resources. He has also supported conservation of rare felids & canids. He has voted for increased funding for international conservation of cranes. Brownback has supported oil drilling in the Arctic National Wildlife Refuge and in the Gulf of Mexico, as a way to reduce dependence on foreign oil. He has promoted the use of renewable energy such as nuclear, wind, solar, and hydroelectric sources to achieve energy independence.

Evolution
Brownback has stated that he is a devout believer in a higher power and rejects macroevolution as an exclusive explanation for the development over time of new species from older ones. Brownback favors giving teachers the freedom to use intelligent design to critique evolutionary theory as part of the Teach the Controversy approach:

Brownback spoke out against the denial of tenure at Iowa State University to astronomer Guillermo Gonzalez, a proponent of intelligent design, saying "such an assault on academic freedom does not bode well for the advancement of true science."

Health care
Brownback opposes a single-payer, government-run health-care system. He supports increased health insurance portability, eliminating insurance rejection due to pre-existing medical conditions, a cap on frivolous malpractice lawsuits, the implementation of an electronic medical records system, an emphasis on preventive care, and tax benefits aimed at making health-care insurance more affordable for the uninsured and targeted to promote universal access. He opposes government-funded elective abortions in accordance with the Hyde Amendment. He has been a strong supporter of legislation to establish a national childhood cancer database and an increase in funding for autism research. Brownback supports negotiating bulk discounts on Medicare drug benefits to reduce prices. In 2007, Senators Brownback and Sherrod Brown (D-OH) sponsored an amendment to the Food and Drug Administration Amendments Act of 2007. The amendment created a prize as an incentive for companies to invest in new drugs and vaccines for neglected tropical diseases. It awards a transferable "Priority Review Voucher" to any company that obtains approval for a treatment for a neglected tropical disease. This provision adds to the market-based incentives available for the development of new medicines for developing world diseases such as malaria, tuberculosis and African sleeping sickness. The prize was initially proposed by Duke University faculty Henry Grabowski, Jeffrey Moe, and David Ridley in their 2006 Health Affairs paper: "Developing Drugs for Developing Countries."

Brownback supports a bill that would introduce price transparency to the U.S. health care industry, as well as a bill which would require the disclosure of Medicare payment rate information.

On December 16, 2006, Brownback gave an interview to the Christian Post, stating: "We can get to this goal of eliminating deaths by cancer in ten years."

Immigration

Senate record 
Brownback had a Senate voting record that has tended to support higher legal immigration levels and strong refugee protection. Brownback was cosponsor of a 2005 bill of Ted Kennedy and John McCain's which would have created a legal path to citizenship for millions of illegal immigrants already present. On June 26, 2007, Brownback voted in favor of S. 1639, the Comprehensive Immigration Reform Act. Brownback supports increasing numbers of legal immigrants, building a fence on Mexican border, and the reform bill "if enforced."
While he initially supported giving guest workers a path to citizenship, Brownback eventually voted "Nay" on June 28, 2007. Brownback has said that he supports immigration reform because the Bible says to welcome the stranger.

Record as governor 
On April 25, 2016, Brownback issued executive orders barring state agencies from facilitating refugee resettlement from Syria and other majority-Muslim countries, in concert with the federal Office of Refugee Resettlement (ORR). He maintained they presented security risks, and his decision entirely removed Kansas from the program. The ORR served notice that it would instead work directly with local refugee resettlement organizations. Brownback's withdrawal from the federal refugee resettlement made Kansas the first state to do so.

Mark Greenberg of the federal Administration for Children and Families said, "If the state were to cease participating in the refugee resettlement program, it would have no effect on the placement of refugees by the State Department in Kansas, or the ORR-funded benefits they can receive." Although states are legally entitled to withdraw from the program, the initial withdrawal for claimed security reasons is the first in the nation.

Kansas ACLU executive director Micah Kubic said Brownback's policy removed Kansas from the process of protecting those seeking safety jeopardized by their religious beliefs even though such refugees receive thorough screenings: "It's very sad and very unfortunate that the governor is allowing fear to get in the way of hospitality and traditional Kansas values." Earlier in 2016, Brownback directed state agencies to use the State Department's list of state sponsors of terrorism to exclude refugees whose presence might constitute security risks. Refugees who were fleeing danger in Iran, Sudan and Syria were singled out for exclusion.

Due to Brownback's initiative, Kansas lost about $2.2 million annually that had been provided to support resettlement agencies. The state had been working with three such agencies, among them Catholic Charities of Northeast Kansas, in making appropriate placements. In the seven months preceding his order, 354 refugees were resettled in Kansas, with 13 Syrians placed in the Wichita or Kansas City areas in the previous 16 months. Representative Jim Ward from Wichita called Brownback's announcement "a distraction", intended solely for political purposes, as Kansas faced a $290 million budget deficit.

Iraq

Brownback supported a political surge coupled with the military surge of 2007 in Iraq and opposed the Democratic Party's strategy of timed withdrawal:

In May 2007, Brownback stated: "We have not lost war; we can win by pulling together". He voted Yes on authorizing use of military force against Iraq, voted No on requiring on-budget funding for Iraq, not emergency funding and voted No on redeploying troops out of Iraq by July 2007. He has also condemned anti-Muslim bigotry in name of anti-terrorism.

On June 7, 2007, Brownback voted against the Habeas Corpus Restoration Act of 2007 when that bill came up for a vote in the Senate Judiciary Committee, on which Brownback sits. (The bill was passed out of the committee by a vote of 11 to 8.) The bill aims to restore habeas corpus rights revoked by the Military Commissions Act of 2006.

Israel and the Palestinian Territories

In October 2007, Brownback announced his support for a plan designed by Benny Elon, then-chairman of Israel's far-right-wing National Union/National Religious Party (NU/NRP) alliance. Elon's positions included dismantling the Palestinian National Authority and Hamas and rejecting a two-state solution. The plan calls for the complete annexation of the West Bank by Israel, and the deportation of its massive majority Arab population to a new Palestinian state to be created within present-day Jordan, against that latter country's historic opposition.

LGBT issues
In 1996, as a member of the House of Representatives, Brownback voted for the Defense of Marriage Act, which defined marriage for purposes of federal law as the union between a man and a woman. Brownback has stated that he believes homosexuality to be immoral as a violation of both Catholic doctrine and natural law. He has voted against gay rights, receiving zeros in four of the last five scorecards as a U.S. senator from the Human Rights Campaign. He opposes both same-sex marriage and same-sex civil unions. He opposes adding sexual orientation and gender identity to federal hate crime laws. He has declined to state a position on homosexual adoption, although a candidate for chair of the Kansas Republican Party claims he was blackballed by political operatives affiliated with Brownback for not opposing homosexual adoption. Brownback supported "don't ask, don't tell," the U.S. government's ban on openly homosexual people in the military. Brownback has associated with organizations such as the Family Research Council and American Family Association. Both organizations are listed as anti-gay hate groups by the Southern Poverty Law Center.

In 2003, Brownback worked with Alliance for Marriage and Traditional Values Coalition to introduce a Senate bill containing the Federal Marriage Amendment, a proposed amendment to the United States Constitution that would federally prohibit same-sex marriage in the United States. The bill was a response to Goodridge v. Department of Public Health, the Massachusetts state court decision finding that same-sex couples had the right to marry in Massachusetts. In reaction to the Goodridge decision, Brownback stated that same-sex marriage threatened the health of American families and culture.

In 2006, Brownback blocked the confirmation of federal judicial nominee Janet T. Neff because she had attended a same-sex commitment ceremony. At first, he agreed to lift the block only if Neff would recuse herself from all cases involving same-sex unions. Brownback later dropped his opposition. Neff was nominated to the United States District Court for the Western District of Michigan by President George W. Bush on March 19, 2007 to a seat vacated David McKeague and was confirmed by a vote of 83-4 by the Senate on July 9, 2007. She received her commission on August 6, 2007.

In April 2011, Brownback began work on a Kansas government program to promote marriage, in part through grants to faith-based and secular social service organizations. In June 2011, the administration revised contract expectations for social work organizations to promote married mother-father families. It explained the change as benefiting children.

In January 2012, Brownback did not include Kansas's sodomy law in a list of unenforced and outdated laws that the legislature should repeal. Gay rights advocates had asked his administration to recommend its repeal because the law has been unenforceable since the Supreme Court's Lawrence v. Texas decision in 2003.

In February 2012, the Brownback administration supported a religious freedom bill that would have stopped cities, school districts, universities, and executive agencies from having nondiscrimination laws or policies that covered sexual orientation or gender identity.

In 2013, after oral arguments in United States v. Windsor, the U.S. Supreme Court case striking down part of the Defense of Marriage Act, Brownback publicly reaffirmed his opposition to same-sex marriage.

In 2014, the U.S. Supreme Court denied petitions to review several federal appellate decisions overturning state bans on same-sex marriage. The court's actions favored repeal of Kansas's ban on same-sex marriage because two of the appeals (Kitchen v. Herbert and Bishop v. Oklahoma) originated in the United States Court of Appeals for the Tenth Circuit, which includes Kansas. In response, Brownback defended Kansas's same-sex marriage ban as being supported by a majority of Kansas voters and criticized "activist judges" for "overruling" the people of Kansas.

On February 10, 2015, Brownback issued an executive order rescinding protections for lesbian, gay, bisexual, and transgender state workers that was put into place by then-Gov. Kathleen Sebelius eight years previously. In the February 11, 2015, edition of The Daily Show, comedian Jon Stewart suggested that an internet campaign similar to the campaign for the neologism "santorum", which had lampooned former U.S. Senator Rick Santorum, could introduce a similarly sex-related neologism "brownbacking" in order to embarrass Brownback. The ACLU generally characterized his actions as being "religious freedom to discriminate."

Stem cell research
Brownback supports adult stem cell research and cord blood stem cells. Brownback appeared with three children adopted from in vitro fertilization clinics to coincide with a Senate debate over the Cord Blood Stem Cell Act of 2005 to show his support for the bill and adult stem cell research. The Religious Freedom Coalition refers to children conceived through the adopted in vitro process as "snowflake children." The term, as proponents explain, is an extension of the idea that the embryos are "frozen and unique," and in that way are similar to snowflakes. Brownback supports the use of cord blood stem cell research for research and treatment. He opposes the use of embryonic stem cells in research or treatments for human health conditions.

Other issues
On September 27, 2006, Brownback introduced a bill called the Truth in Video Game Rating Act (S.3935), which would regulate the rating system of computer and video games.

On June 15, 2006, President George W. Bush signed into law the Broadcast Decency Enforcement Act of 2005 sponsored by Brownback, a former broadcaster himself. The new law stiffens the penalties for each violation of the Act. The Federal Communications Commission will be able to impose fines in the amount of $325,000 for each violation by each station that violates decency standards. The legislation raises the fine by tenfold.

On September 3, 1997, Meredith O'Rourke, an employee of Kansas firm Triad Management Services, was deposed by the Senate Committee on Governmental Affairs regarding her activities and observations while providing services for the company relative to fund raising and advertising for Brownback. The deposition claims that Triad circumvented existing campaign finance laws by channeling donations through Triad, and also bypassed the campaign law with Triad running 'issue ads' during Brownback's first campaign for the Senate.

He has said he does not believe there is an inherent right to privacy in the U.S. Constitution. He has, however, expressed disapproval of George W. Bush's assertions on the legality of the NSA wiretapping program.

Brownback voted to maintain current gun laws: guns sold without trigger locks. He opposes gun control.

Brownback is a lead sponsor of the International Marriage Broker Regulation Act of 2005 and frequently speaks out against the mail-order bride industry.

Brownback introduced into the Senate a resolution (Senate Joint Resolution 4) calling for the United States to apologize for past mistreatment of Native Americans.

Brownback's voting record on civil rights was rated 20 percent by the ACLU. He voted "yes" on ending special funding for minority and women-owned business and "yes" on recommending a Constitutional ban on flag desecration. He opposes quotas in admission to institutions of higher education. He voted "yes" on increasing penalties for drug offenses and voted "yes" on more penalties for gun and drug violations.

Brownback voted against banning chemical weapons. He voted "yes" on reauthorizing the PATRIOT Act and voted "yes" on extending the PATRIOT Act's wiretap provision. In May 2007, Brownback stated that "Iran is the lead sponsor of terrorism around the world." He supports talks and peaceful measures with Iran, but no formal diplomatic relations.

Relationship with Koch family
Throughout his Senate career, Brownback's principal campaign donors were the politically influential libertarian Koch brothers of Kansas, and their enterprises, including Kansas-based Koch Industries—and Brownback was one of the candidates most-heavily funded by the Kochs' campaign donations. Over the course of his political career, they donated hundreds of thousands of dollars to his campaigns.

Brownback's signature tax and regulatory policies coincide tightly with the Kochs' position on those issues. It was crafted with the assistance of the Koch-backed American Legislative Exchange Council (ALEC) and Brownback's first Budget Director, Steve Anderson. Anderson was a former Koch employee who previously worked at the Kochs' principal political organization, the libertarian think-tank Americans for Prosperity (AFP), developing a "model budget" for Kansas, until his appointment as Brownback's first budget director. Anderson remained Brownback's budget director for three years, before returning to a Koch-linked think tank, the Kansas Policy Institute.

Brownback also hired the wife of a Koch-enterprise executive as his spokesperson.

Brownback, however, has denied that the Kochs have an undue influence in Kansas government, and analysts have noted key differences between Brownback and the Kochs in two of Brownback's main gubernatorial policy areas: 
 social issues: (on abortion, Brownback is pro-life, the Kochs pro-choice; Brownback opposes various LGBT rights, the libertarian Kochs accept them); and
 renewable energy standards for Kansas, which promote renewable energy (supported by Brownback; opposed by the Kochs, whose chief business is the fossil-fuel industry).

Personal life

Brownback is married to the former Mary Stauffer, whose family owned and operated Stauffer Communications until its sale in 1995. They have five children: Abby, Andy, Elizabeth, Mark, and Jenna. Two of their children are adopted. A former evangelical Christian, Brownback converted to Catholicism in 2002 and is associated with the conservative denominational organization, Opus Dei, but still sometimes attends an evangelical church with his family.

Electoral history

U.S. House of Representatives

{| class="wikitable" style="margin:0.5em; font-size:95%;"
|+ Results, 1994  elections:
!|Year
!
!|Democratic
!|Votes
!|Pct
!
!|Republican
!|Votes
!|Pct
!
!|Overall turnout
|-
|1994
|
| |John W. Carlin
| align="right" |71,025
| |34.4%
|
| |Sam Brownback
| align="right" |135,725
| |65.6%
|
| style="text-align:right;"|206,750

U.S. Senator

In 1996, Bob Dole resigned from the U.S. Senate to focus on his campaign for U.S. president. Lieutenant Governor Sheila Frahm was appointed to Dole's senate seat by Governor Bill Graves. Brownback defeated Frahm in the Republican primary and won the general election against Jill Docking to serve out the remainder of Dole's term.

{| class="wikitable" style="margin:0.5em; font-size:95%;"
|+1996 United States Senate special election in Kansas: Republican primary results
!|Year
!
!|Incumbent
!|Votes
!|Pct
!
!|Challenger
!|Votes
!|Pct
!
!|Challenger
!|Votes
!|Pct
!
!|Overall turnout
|-
|1996
|
| |Sheila Frahm
| align="right" |142,487
| |41.6%
|
| |Sam Brownback
| align="right" |187,914
| |54.8%
|
| |Christina Campbell-Cline
| align="right" |12,378
| |3.6%
|
| style="text-align:right;"|342,779

{| class="wikitable" style="margin:0.5em; font-size:95%;"
|+1996 United States Senate special election in Kansas: general election results
!|Year
!
!|Democratic
!|Votes
!|Pct
!
!|Republican
!|Votes
!|Pct
!
!|Reform
!|Votes
!|Pct
!
!|Overall turnout
|-
|1996
|
| |Jill Docking
| align="right" |461,344
| |43.3%
|
| |Sam Brownback
| align="right" |574,021
| |53.9%
|
| |Donald R. Klaassen
| align="right" |29,351
| |2.8%
|
| style="text-align:right;"|1,064,716

{| class="wikitable" style="margin:0.5em; font-size:95%;"
|+ U.S. Senate elections in Kansas (Class III): results 1998–2004
!|Year
!
!|Democratic
!|Votes
!|Pct
!
!|Republican
!|Votes
!|Pct
!
!|Libertarian
!|Votes
!|Pct
!
!|Reform
!|Votes
!|Pct
!
!|Overall turnout
|-
|1998
|
| |
| align="right" |229,718
| |31.6%
|
| |Sam Brownback
| align="right" |474,639
| |65.3%
|
| |Tom Oyler
| align="right" |11,545
| align="right" |1.6%
|
| |Alvin Bauman
| align="right" |11,334
| align="right" |1.6%
|
| style="text-align:right;"|727,236
|-
|2004
|
| |Lee Jones
| align="right" |310,337
| |27.5%
|
| |Sam Brownback
| align="right" |780,863
| |69.2%
|
| | Rosile
| align="right" |21,842
| align="right" |1.9%
|
| |George Cook
| align="right" |15,980
| align="right" |1.4%
|
| style="text-align:right;"|1,129,022

Governor of Kansas

See also
 United States immigration debate
 How Democracy Works Now: Twelve Stories

References

External links

 Governor Sam Brownback official government website (archived)
 Sam Brownback for Governor
 Genealogy of Sam Brownback
 

 Sam Brownback's presidential campaign finance reports and data at the FEC
 Sam Brownbeck's presidential campaign contributions
 Review of Brownback's book by OnTheIssues.org
 Ethics complaint against Sam Brownback
Publications concerning Kansas Governor Brownback's administration available via the KGI Online Library

1956 births
20th-century American lawyers
20th-century American politicians
20th-century Roman Catholics
21st-century American politicians
21st-century Roman Catholics
American people of German descent
American Christian creationists
Converts to Roman Catholicism from Evangelicalism
Republican Party governors of Kansas
Intelligent design advocates
Living people
Kansas lawyers
Kansas Secretaries of Agriculture
Kansas State University alumni
People from Garnett, Kansas
People from Linn County, Kansas
Promise Keepers
Republican Party members of the United States House of Representatives from Kansas
Republican Party United States senators from Kansas
Roman Catholic activists
Trump administration personnel
United States Ambassadors-at-Large
Candidates in the 2008 United States presidential election
University of Kansas alumni
White House Fellows
Catholics from Kansas
Conservatism in the United States